A Damsel in Distress is a 1937 English-themed Hollywood musical comedy film starring Fred Astaire,  George Burns, Gracie Allen and Joan Fontaine. Loosely based upon P.G. Wodehouse's 1919 novel of the same name, and the 1928 stage play written by Wodehouse and Ian Hay, it has music and lyrics by George and Ira Gershwin, and was directed by George Stevens, the second (and last) Astaire musical directed by Stevens; the first was Swing Time.

Plot
Everyone on staff at Tottney Castle knows that the lovely Lady Alyce Marshmorton (Joan Fontaine) must marry soon, so a wager is proposed as to the identity of the lucky man. With all the likely candidates already claimed, young footman Albert (Harry Watson) places a bet on a "Mr. X," someone totally out of the blue.

Lady Alyce secretly has a romantic interest in an American no one from her family has yet met. She leaves the castle one day to venture into London, where by chance she encounters Jerry Halliday (Fred Astaire). He is an American entertainer, accompanied by press agent George (George Burns) and secretary Gracie (Gracie Allen), but he is not well enough known to be recognized by Lady Alyce.

Jerry is incorrectly led to believe that he is the American that Lady Alyce is in love with. He goes to the castle, encouraged by Albert but discouraged by Keggs (Reginald Gardiner), a scheming butler whose money is on another beau. The closest Jerry can get to Lady Alyce is a castle tour, at least until Albert can sneak him upstairs.

False impressions abound, as Jerry also fails to recognize Lady Alyce's father (Montagu Love), the lord of the manor. He is slapped in the face in a Tunnel of Love, misunderstanding the young lady's intentions entirely. In the end, however, he and Lady Alyce do find romance.

Cast
 Fred Astaire as Jerry
 George Burns as George
 Gracie Allen as Gracie
 Joan Fontaine as Lady Alyce
 Reginald Gardiner as Keggs
 Ray Noble as Reggie
 Constance Collier as Lady Caroline
 Montagu Love as Lord Marshmorton
 Harry Watson as Albert
 Jan Duggan as Miss Ruggles

Overview
The film was made at George Gershwin's instigation, an enthusiasm that Wodehouse mischievously attributed to the fact that his novel was about a successful American songwriter named George Bevan. Gershwin died of a brain tumor while the film was in production. The film was released four months after his death.

For this, the first Astaire RKO film not to feature Ginger Rogers, the nineteen-year-old Fontaine was chosen. It soon emerged that Fontaine could not dance, but Stevens persuaded Astaire not to replace her with Ruby Keeler. The film was the first Astaire film to lose money, costing $1,035,000 to produce and losing $65,000.

In mid-1937 Burns and Allen and Ray Noble were working together elsewhere—Noble was bandleader for their NBC-Red radio show.

Charley Chase was originally supposed to appear in the film as Jerry’s valet. However, he had to drop out due to poor health and his part was rewritten for Burns and Allen.

The "Fun House" sequence garnered co-choreographer Hermes Pan the 1937 Academy Award for Best Dance Direction. Carroll Clark was nominated for the Academy Award for Best Art Direction

Orchestrator Robert Russell Bennett and conductor Victor Baravalle had previously worked together on the original stage production of Show Boat, as well as the 1936 film version. They would work together twice more, on the Astaire-Rogers films Carefree (1938) and The Story of Vernon and Irene Castle (1939), before Baravalle's sudden death in 1939.

Accolades
The film was nominated for the American Film Institute's 2006 list AFI's Greatest Movie Musicals.

Key songs and dance routines
The choreography explores dancing around, past, and through obstacles, and in confined spaces.

 "I Can't Be Bothered Now": sung by Astaire while executing a tap solo with cane in the middle of a London street and escaping on a bus.
 "Put Me to the Test": Astaire, Burns, and Allen comic tap dance with whisk brooms, a routine inspired by vaudeville duo Evans and Evans and introduced to Astaire by Burns, who quipped: "Gracie and I ended up teaching Astaire how to dance".
 "Stiff Upper Lip": sung by Gracie Allen, followed by the "Fun House" dance sequence by Astaire, Burns, and Allen through an amusement park funhouse, complete with hall of mirrors.
 "Things Are Looking Up": Astaire sings one of Gershwin's "most beautiful, yet underappreciated ballads", followed by a romantic dance through the woods with Fontaine, where George Stevens uses trees to hide Fontaine's terpsichorean shortcomings.
 "A Foggy Day (in London Town)": Astaire introduces what has become a standard in the Great American Songbook, sung while alternately walking and dancing solo through a wooded landscape.  It was later featured heavily in the film The Notorious Landlady, which featured Astaire in a supporting role.
 "Nice Work If You Can Get It": the film's second Gershwin standard is introduced by Astaire and chorus, followed by an Astaire tap solo, executed while confined by and playing a set of drums. It was shot in one continuous take.
 The movie also features two faux madrigals written by the Gershwins: "Sing of Spring" and "The Jolly Tar and the Milkmaid". These are performed by a group of madrigal singers, with Astaire joining in on the latter song.

Notes and references

Green, Stanley (1999) Hollywood Musicals Year by Year (2nd ed.), pub. Hal Leonard Corporation  page 75

External links
 
 
 
 
 Illustrated review (1999) by Michael Skupin at Wodehouse.org

1937 films
American black-and-white films
1937 musical comedy films
Films based on works by P. G. Wodehouse
Films directed by George Stevens
RKO Pictures films
George Gershwin in film
American musical comedy films
1930s American films